Binibining Pilipinas 2003 (billed as The Ruby Year) was the 40th edition of Binibining Pilipinas. It took place at the Smart Araneta Coliseum in Quezon City, Metro Manila, Philippines on March 15, 2003.

At the end of the event, Karen Loren Agustin crowned Carla Gay Balingit as Binibining Pilipinas Universe 2003. Katherine Anne Manalo crowned Maria Rafaela Yunon as Binibining Pilipinas World 2003, while Kristine Alzar crowned Jhezarie Javier as Bb. Pilipinas-International 2003. Kate Sephora Baesa was named First Runner-Up, while Noela Mae Evangelista was named Second Runner-Up.

Later that year, Noela Mae Evangelista was appointed as Binibining Pilipinas Queen of Tourism 2003.

Results
Color keys
  The contestant Won in an International pageant.
  The contestant was a Runner-up in an International pageant.
  The contestant did not place.

Special Awards

Contestants 
27 contestants competed for the three titles.

Notes

Post-pageant Notes 
 Carla Gay Balingit competed at Miss Universe 2003 in Panama City but was unplaced. On the other hand, Maria Rafaela Yunon competed at Miss World 2003 in Sanya, China and was one of the five finalists.
 Jhezarie Javier competed at Miss International 2003 in Tokyo but was unplaced. She then was handpicked to compete at the Miss ASEAN 2005 pageant in Bali, Indonesia. She was crowned Miss ASEAN 2005 and also won the Miss Natural Beauty award.
 Noela Mae Evangelista competed at Queen of Tourism International 2003 in Turkey and won.

References

External links
 Official pageant website

2003
2003 in the Philippines
2003 beauty pageants